Manuel Cruz may refer to:

 Manuel Cruz Rodríguez (born 1951), Spanish philosopher and politician, 60th President of the Spanish Senate
 Manuel Cruz (boxer), Mexican boxer
 Manuel Aurelio Cruz (born 1953), Cuban American prelate of the Roman Catholic Church
 Manuel Marrero Cruz (born 1963), Prime Minister of Cuba